Karl-Axel Karlsson (5 September 1939 – 3 December 2011) was a Swedish sports shooter. He competed at the 1972 and 1976 Summer Olympics.

References

External links
 

1939 births
2011 deaths
People from Uddevalla Municipality
Swedish male sport shooters
Olympic shooters of Sweden
Shooters at the 1972 Summer Olympics
Shooters at the 1976 Summer Olympics
Sportspeople from Västra Götaland County